Fiducia may refer to:

380 Fiducia, a main-belt asteroid
Fiducia IT, a defunct German internet service provider
Fiducia & GAD IT, a German internet service provider

People with the surname
Donna Fiducia (born 1956), American television and radio personality